Jonathan Roberts (born Jonathan Robert Stubenrauch; April 20, 1974) is an American professional ballroom dancer. He decided to take up dancing after he received a free trial at a local dance studio and enjoyed it. He currently resides in California.

Achievements
Jonathan Roberts is most well known for dancing on the United States version of Dancing with the Stars and choreographing routines on So You Think You Can Dance. In the past Roberts has competed and won the following awards.

 2008 World Professional Smooth Champion, with Valentina Kostenko
 2008 US National Professional Smooth Champion, with Valentina Kostenko
 2004 US National Professional Rising Star Latin Champion, with Anna Trebunskaya
 2003 Blackpool Professional Rising Star Latin Vice Champion, with Anna Trebunskaya
 1997 US National Professional Rising Star Ballroom Champion, with Roberta Sun
 USA pro-am 10 dance champion
 USA pro-am Latin champion
 USA pro-am American Ballroom champion

Dancing with the Stars
He competed in seasons 1, 2, 4, 5, 6, 8 and 9 of the U.S. version of Dancing with the Stars.  In Season 1, he danced with celebrity Rachel Hunter.  They were the third couple to be eliminated coming in 4th place.  In Season 2, he danced with celebrity Giselle Fernández.  They were also eliminated in the third week and came in 8th place. In Season 4, he danced with Heather Mills. They were voted off in the sixth week of the competition and came in 7th place. Roberts returned for the fifth season and was partnered with entertainer Marie Osmond. They achieved 3rd place, being eliminated during the final show of the season. Season five was Roberts' most successful season so far.

His partner for Season 6 was Monica Seles. They scored 15 for the Foxtrot and 15 for the Mambo. This is the lowest judge's score of the season as of March 25, 2008. Roberts and Seles were one of the first two couples eliminated from the competition.  His then-wife Anna Trebunskaya was sick during her week 3 practice, and a video of Jonathan dancing and teaching her partner, Steve Guttenberg was shown. After this, for the encore performance, he and Guttenberg were asked to do the entire routine.

Jonathan returned for Season 8, and was partnered with pop singer Belinda Carlisle but they became the first couple eliminated, making this the second time that he was eliminated in the first Results Show. Despite being eliminated first, he & Belinda held a higher average than a few celebrities who lasted longer than them. 

Jonathan also returned for Season 9 of Dancing with the Stars and was paired with Grammy Award winning artist Macy Gray. The couple were the second pair to be voted off in the season's first results show, making this the third time in a row Roberts was voted off after the first week, and making Jonathan the professional dancer on the show tied voted off first the most times (three times) with Edyta Sliwinska and Keo Motsepe

With Rachel Hunter

With Giselle Fernandez

With Heather Mills

With Marie Osmond

With Monica Seles

With Belinda Carlisle

With Macy Gray

References

External links
Official Site
Dancing with the Stars Biography
Dancing With the Stars
West Coast swing: Jonathan Roberts Reflects on Stepping up from Campbell Studio to TV Spotlight

1974 births
Roberts, Jonathan (dancer)
Living people
Place of birth missing (living people)
Participants in American reality television series